Consumption Daily, also known as Xiaofei Ribao or Consumer Daily,  is a national daily newspaper focusing on the areas of life and consumption published in the People's Republic of China. It is supervised and sponsored by the China National Light Industry Council. The paper was first published on January 3, 1985, and its predecessor was China Light Industry News (中国轻工业报).

Controversies
In 2012, Yuan Renguo (袁仁国), former chairman of Kweichow Moutai was exposed as holding a press pass from Consumption Daily, was called "China's most powerful journalist" by some Chinese language media. After the incident, the press cards of Yuan Renguo and others were cancelled. The Consumption Daily explained that Yuan Ringuo had been a special correspondent for the newspaper many years ago.

References

Publications established in 1985
Newspapers published in Beijing
Daily newspapers published in China
Chinese-language newspapers (Simplified Chinese)